Roman Vladimirovich Kurazhov (born 28 July 1999) is a Russian football player. He plays for FC Dynamo Vologda.

Club career
He made his debut in the Russian Professional Football League for FC Krasnodar-2 on 10 April 2017 in a game against FC Spartak Vladikavkaz. He made his Russian Football National League debut for Krasnodar-2 on 24 October 2018 in a game against FC Nizhny Novgorod.

References

External links
 
 

1999 births
People from Sokol, Vologda Oblast
Living people
Russian footballers
Russia youth international footballers
Association football midfielders
FC Krasnodar players
FC Krasnodar-2 players
FC Sokol Saratov players
FC KAMAZ Naberezhnye Chelny players
FC Dynamo Stavropol players
FC Saturn Ramenskoye players
FC Dynamo Vologda players
Russian First League players
Russian Second League players
Sportspeople from Vologda Oblast